Meshal Al-Sebyani (born 11 April 2001) is a Saudi Arabian professional footballer who plays as a defender for Pro League side Al-Faisaly.

Career
Al-Sebyani was a member of the youth team of Al-Faisaly. He made his debut for the first team in 2019.

Honours

Club
Al-Faisaly
 King Cup: 2020–21

International
Saudi Arabia U23
AFC U-23 Asian Cup: 2022
WAFF U-23 Championship: 2022

References

External links 
 

2001 births
Living people
Association football defenders
Saudi Arabian footballers
Saudi Arabia youth international footballers
Saudi Arabia international footballers
Al-Faisaly FC players
Saudi Professional League players
Saudi First Division League players